Tilantongo was a Mixtec citystate in the Mixteca Alta region of the modern-day state of Oaxaca which is now visible as an archeological site and a modern town of Santiago Tilantongo. It is located at 17°15' N. Lat. and  97°17' W. Long. Its Mixtec name was Ñuu Tnoo-Huahi Andehui meaning Black Town-Temple of Heaven

History
Archeological excavations conducted by Alfonso Caso in the 1960s suggest that Tilantongo is among the oldest settlements in Oaxaca with architecture from the preclassic Monte Albán I phase. Preclassic and Classic remains were found at Monte Negro and the Postclassic settlement was located in the present day town of Tilantongo, slightly north of the Classic settlement.

The documentary record shows that Tilantongo was an important Mixtec polity in the Postclassic period. Mixtec picture codices, such as the Codex Zouche-Nuttall, tell the history of Lord 8 Deer who ruled Tilantongo in the eleventh century, and how he linked the Tilantongo dynasty with the central Mexican Toltecs.

References

 

Populated places in Oaxaca
Histories of cities in Mexico